Choice Microfinance Bank, whose full name is Choice Microfinance Bank Kenya Limited or CMBKL, is a deposit-taking microfinance bank in Kenya, licensed by the Central Bank of Kenya, the national banking regulator.

Location
The geographical coordinates of the headquarters of the microfinance bank are: 01°23'51.6"S, 36°45'28.0"E (Latitude:-1.397667; Longitude:36.757778).

Overview
CMBKL is a private financial services provider in Kenya. It was awarded a microfinance banking license by the Central Bank of Kenya, on 13 May 2015. The institution was licensed as a community-microfinance bank, authorized to provide services in Kajiado North Constituency in Kajiado County. , the institution was in the process of raising fresh capital, in order to qualify for a national licence that authorizes the company to conduct business in all the counties of the country. A regional microfinance company requires KSh20 million (US$200,000) in capital to obtain a licence, while a national microfince bank requires a minimum capital investment of KSh60 (US$600,000). In May 2017, the institution announced its intention to introduce internet banking and mobile banking services.

Ownership
The institution is majority owned by Kenyans in the Diaspora, especially the United States, the United Kingdom, Germany, China and South Africa.

Branches
As of March 2018, the microfinance bank has one branch at Siron Place, along Magadi Road, in Ongata Rongai, Kajiado North Constituency, in Kajiado County, Kenya.

See also
 List of banks in Kenya
 Microfinance in Kenya

References

External links
 Official Website

Microfinance companies of Africa
Banks of Kenya
Banks established in 2015
Kenyan companies established in 2015